Kevin Phillip Hurley (24 January 1914 – 30 August 1991) was an Australian rules footballer who played with North Melbourne in the Victorian Football League (VFL).

Notes

External links 

1914 births
1991 deaths
Australian rules footballers from Victoria (Australia)
North Melbourne Football Club players